This is a list of electricity-industry related organisations based in India.

Union Ministry of Power

Regulatory Bodies 
 Central Electricity Authority
Central Electricity Regulatory Commission
Bureau of Energy Efficiency

Central Public Sector Units 
Nuclear Power Corporation of India
PowerGrid Corporation of India
NHPC Limited
NTPC Limited
Power System Operation Corporation
Neyveli Lignite Corporation
Damodar Valley Corporation

State Ministry of Power

Andhra Pradesh 
Andhra Pradesh Power Generation Corporation
Transmission Corporation of Andhra Pradesh
Andhra Pradesh Eastern Power Distribution Company Limited
Andhra Pradesh Central Power Distribution Company Limited
Andhra Pradesh Southern Power Distribution Company Limited

Assam 
Assam State Electricity Board

Bihar 
Bihar State Power Holding Company Limited
North Bihar Power Distribution Company Limited
South Bihar Power Distribution Company Limited

Chhattisgarh 
Chhattisgarh State Power Generation Company Limited

Gujarat 
Dakshin Gujarat Vij Company Ltd.
Gujarat Urja Vikas Nigam Ltd.
Madhya Gujarat Vij Company Ltd.
Paschim Gujarat Vij Company Ltd.
Gujarat State Electricity Corporation Ltd.
Gujarat Electricity Corporation Ltd.
Uttar Gujarat Vij Company Ltd.

Haryana 
Dakshin Haryana Bijli Vitran Nigam
Uttar Haryana Bijli Vitran Nigam
Haryana Vidyut Prasaran Nigam Limited
Haryana Power Generation Corporation

Delhi 
Delhi Vidyut Board
Delhi Electricity Regulatory Commission
Delhi Transco Limited
BRPL
BYPL
TPDDL
IPGCL
PPCL

Jharkhand 
Jharkhand State Electricity Board

Karnataka 
Karnataka Power Corporation Limited (KPCL)
Karnataka Power Transmission Corporation Limited (KPTCL)
MESCOM, Mangaluru
CESC, Mysuru
BESCOM, Bengaluru
HESCOM, Hubballi
GESCOM, Kalaburagi

Kerala 
Kerala State Electricity Board

Madhya Pradesh 
Madhya Pradesh Power Generation Company Limited
Madhya Pradesh Power Transmission Company Limited
Madhya Pradesh Poorv Kshetra Vidyut Company Limited
Madhya Pradesh Madhya Kshetra Vidyut Vitaran Company Limited
Madhya Pradesh Paschim Kshetra Vidyut Vitaran Company Limited
Madhya Pradesh Power Management Company Limited
Madhya Pradesh Electricity Regulatory Commission

Maharashtra 
Maharashtra State Electricity Board
Maharashtra State Electricity Distribution Company Limited

Maharashtra State Electricity Transmission Company Limited
Maharashtra State Power Generation Company Limited

Rajasthan 
Rajasthan Rajya Vidyut Utpadan Nigam
Rajasthan Rajya Vidyut Prasaran Nigam Limited

Uttar Pradesh 
Uttar Pradesh Rajya Vidyut Utpadan Nigam (UPRVUN)
Uttar Pradesh Rajya Vidyut Utpadan Nigam Limited (UPRVUNL),
Uttar Pradesh Power Corporation Limited (UPPCL),
UP Power Transmission Corporation Limited (UPPTCL),
UP Jal Vidyut Nigam Limited (UPJVNL).

West Bengal 
West Bengal Power Development Corporation Limited
West Bengal State Electricity Board
CESC

Odisha 
Odisha Hydro Power Corporation
Odisha Power Generation Corporation
Odisha Electricity Regulatory Commission
Central Electricity Supply Utility of Odisha
Western Electricity Supply Company of Odisha
Odisha Power Transmission Corporation Limited
TP Northern Odisha Distribution Limited (TPNODL)

Tamil Nadu 
TNEB Limited
Tamil Nadu Generation and Distribution Corporation Limited
Tamil Nadu Transmission Corporation Limited
Tamil Nadu Energy Development Agency
Tamil Nadu Electrical Licensing Board
Tamil Nadu Electricity Regulatory Commission
Tamil Nadu Electrical Inspectorate

Telangana 
Telangana Power Generation Corporation
Transmission Corporation of Telangana
Telangana State Northern Power Distribution Company Limited
Telangana State Southern Power Distribution Company Limited

Punjab 
Punjab State Power Corporation Limited
Punjab State Power Transmission Corporation Limited

See also 
 Off-the-grid

 
 
Electricity
India
India
Electricity